Cottingley is a suburban village within the City of Bradford in West Yorkshire, England between Shipley and Bingley. It is known for the Cottingley Fairies, which appeared in a series of photographs taken there during the early 20th century.

Etymology
The village is first mentioned in the Domesday Book of 1086 as Cotingelai in the wapentake of Skyrack and the lands of Erneis of Buron. The first element is the personal name Cotta (the origin of which is unknown), and the second the suffix -ingas denoting a group of associated people. Thus the Cottingas were a group descended from or otherwise associated with someone called Cotta. This group name was then compounded with the Old English word lēah ('open land in a wood'). Thus the name once meant 'the clearing of the descendants of Cola'.

History
The village was clustered around the original St Michael's Church, Cottingley Town Hall and the Sun Inn.

In 1917, two girls, 15-year old Elsie Wright and nine-year old Frances Griffiths, claimed to have photographed fairies in the dell (Cottingley Beck) at the bottom of their garden. This led to the Cottingley Fairies hoax, which still resonates in the village into the modern day. The village has a festival to celebrate the story (Cottingley Fairy Fest), and in 1997, parts of a film inspired by the story, FairyTale: A True Story, were filmed in the village.

Governance
Cottingley is part of Bingley Rural Ward on Bradford City Council and part of the Parliamentary constituency of Shipley, represented since 2005 by the Conservative Philip Davies. At the 2011 Census, Bingley Rural Ward, which includes Cullingworth, Denholme, Harden and Wilsden, had a population of 17,895.

Geography

The road through the village has been changed at least twice. Originally, to exit south from Bingley, travellers had to cross Ireland Bridge then Beckfoot Bridge and approach Cottingley on the south side of the river. The bridge across the River Aire leading towards Bingley was built by 1649, when it appears in the Book of Bridges in the Session Rolls of Wakefield. It was recorded in 1664 that "a great floode hath taken away the foundations so that the whole bridge is shrunke." Cottingley Bridge was rebuilt and in the early 19th century, it was a hamlet independent of Cottingley.

The A650 road is now to the north of Cottingley after a bypass was built and opened in 2003. Cottingley beck cuts a deep, narrow, rocky channel flowing north to the River Aire.

Although the road, railway and the Leeds and Liverpool Canal are on the opposite side of the Aire Valley to Cottingley, Parliament was asked to consider making the Aire Navigable from Cottingley to Shipley.

Old mine shafts litter the fields either side of Cottingley Cliffe Road shown as either Old Coal Pits or Coal pits on the 1852 map, and one is listed as Cottingley Moor Bottom as having closed in 1860.

Amenities
There are two churches in the village; St Mary and St Monica is the Catholic church and the Church of St Michael and All Angels is the Anglican Church. St Michaels and All Angels was part of a regeneration project that spent £4.5 million, which included meeting rooms, a doctor's surgery, nursery and youth facilities and 50 new homes. The project started because a 1960s war memorial had been vandalised, and reports in the press caught the eye of Prince Charles, who came to speak at the grand unveiling.

The village has a primary school on Cottingley Moor Road, rated Good by OFSTED, and a secondary school, Dixons Cottingley Academy. Cottingley Town Hall, which is now grade II listed, celebrated its 150th anniversary in 2015.

Notable residents
Dominic Brunt – lived in the house of the Cottingley Fairy hoax in the early 2000s
Elsie Wright and Frances Griffiths (Cottingley Fairies girls)

Other notes
 Cottingley Hall is shown on the 1908 map near the site of Cottingley Manor Park. On the 1852 map it is  Cottingley House. (As Cottingley Hall bore the date 1659 RAF (Robert & Anne Ferrand) together with the Knights double cross, Cottingley House and Cottingley Hall are different names for the same property.)
 Cottingley also had a reservoir managed by Cottingley Water Works Co. This is shown above Manor Farm (now March Cote Lane) on the local map of 1908.

See also
Listed buildings in Bingley

References

Sources

External links

 Cottingley.Net – The Cottingley Network
 Cottingley Connect – non commercial site charting Cottingley village from domesday to present day including the Cottingley fairy story
 .

Villages in West Yorkshire
Geography of the City of Bradford